Laskov is the name of several locations or persons:

 Laškov, a village and municipality (obec) in the Czech Republic
 Bozhin Laskov (Божин Георгиев Ласков), a Bulgarian association football player
 Haim Laskov (Chaim Laskov, Khaim Laskov), the fifth Chief of Staff of the Israel Defense Forces
 Petra Laskov, a fictional character exclusive to the Ultimate Marvel universe that's known as Insect Queen and Red Wasp
 Tzipora Laskov, Israeli nurse and politician

See also
 Leskov (disambiguation)